HMS Tang was a Royal Navy Ballahoo-class schooner of four 12-pounder carronades and a crew of 20. The prime contractor for the vessel was Goodrich & Co., in Bermuda, and she was launched in 1807. Like many of her class and the related Cuckoo-class schooners, she succumbed to the perils of the sea relatively early in her career.

Service
Tang was commissioned in 1807 under Lieutenant George Senhouse. In 1808 Lieutenant Joseph Derby took command.

Fate
Tang was lost with all hands in February 1808 in the North Atlantic while sailing from Bermuda to Britain. Reports indicate that she had 25 people aboard, suggesting that she may also have been carrying some passengers.

Citations

References
 
 
 

1807 ships
Ships built in Bermuda
Ballahoo-class schooners
Maritime incidents in 1808
Shipwrecks in the Atlantic Ocean
Warships lost with all hands